Jean Schwartz (November 4, 1878 – November 30, 1956) was a Hungarian-born American songwriter.

Schwartz was born in Budapest, Hungary. His family moved to New York City when he was 10 years old. He took various music-related jobs including demonstrating and selling sheet music in department stores before being hired as a staff pianist and song-plugger by the Shapiro-Bernstein Publishing House of Tin Pan Alley. He published his first composition, a cakewalk, in 1899. He became known as an accomplished lyricist, although he also continued to write music.

In 1901, he began a successful collaboration with William Jerome. They co-wrote many songs which were used in Broadway shows, including "Mr. Dooley," which was sung by the title character in The Wizard of Oz, as well as the Ziegfeld Follies. They worked with Eddie Morton for the song "I'm a Member of the Midnight Crew" in 1909. Their biggest hit together was the 1910 song "Chinatown, My Chinatown", still popular with Dixieland bands. Schwartz and Jerome stopped working together in 1913.

Songwriters on parade
In the late 1930s, Schwartz and several of his fellow hitmakers formed a revue called "Songwriters on Parade", performing all across the Eastern Seaboard on the Loew's and Keith circuits.

Schwartz continued working on show tunes through 1937. He died in Los Angeles, California on the 30th of November 1956.

Songs 
 1911 "April Fool Rag"
 1911 "Rum Tum Tiddle"
 1912 "That Chop Stick Rag"
 1914 "I Love You Just Like Lincoln Loved the Old Red, White and Blue" (w. William Jerome & Joe Young)
 1915 "Goodbye Virginia" (w. Grant Clarke)
 1915 "Hello, Hawaii, How Are You?" (with Bert Kalmar and Edgar Leslie}.
 1915 "Shooting the Bull Around the Bulletin Board" (w. William Jerome)
 1916 "Are You Prepared for the Summer?" (w. Bert Kalmar & Edgar Leslie)
 1916 "I'm Going Back Home and Have a Wonderful Time" (w. William Jerome)
 1917 "America Needs You Like a Mother. Would You Turn Your Mother Down?" (w. Grant Clark)
 1918 "Boots Boots Boots" (w. Blanche Merrill)
 1918 "Hello Central! Give Me No Man's Land" (w. Sam M. Lewis & Joe Young)
 1918 "I'm On a Long Long Ramble - Over There I'll Be Rambling with You" (w. Sam Lewis & Joe Young)
 1918 "Tell That to the Marines" with Al Jolson (w. Harold Atteridge)
 1918 "I'm Over Here and You're Over There" (w. Harold Atteridge)
 1918 "On the Level You're a Little Devil" (w. Joe Young)
 1918 "Rock-a-Bye Your Baby with a Dixie Melody" (w. Sam M. Lewis & Joe Young)
 1918 "Twit, Twit, Twit" (w. Blanche Merrill)
 1918 "Wedding Bells, Will You Ever Ring for Me?" (w. Sam M. Lewis & Joe Young)
 1919 "I'm Going to Break That Mason-Dixon Line Until I Get to That Gal of Mine" (w. Alfred Bryan)
 1930 "Au Revoir, Pleasant Dreams" (was adopted by Ben Bernie as his broadcasting theme song)

Selected works
Schwartz, Jean, and William Jerome. Bedelia: The Irish Coon Song Serenade. New York: Shapiro, Remick & Co, 1903.  
Schwartz, Jean, and William Jerome. Chinatown, My Chinatown. New York: Jerome H. Remick & Co, 1910. 
Schwartz, Jean, Sam M. Lewis, and Joe Young. Hello Central! Give Me No Man's Land. New York: Waterson-Berlin & Snyder Co., 1918. 
Schwartz, Jean, Sam M. Lewis, Joe Young, and Sigmund Romberg. Rock-a-Bye Your Baby with a Dixie Melody. New York: Waterson, Berlin & Snyder, 1918.

References

External links
 
 Jean Schwartz recordings at the Discography of American Historical Recordings.

1878 births
1956 deaths
Musicians from Budapest
Jewish American songwriters
Hungarian musicians
Austro-Hungarian emigrants to the United States